Augusto Casimiro dos Santos (11 May 1889 – 23 September 1967) was a Portuguese journalist, a poet and political commentator.

Biography
Augusto Casimiro dos Santos was born in Amarante, he later studied at its primary school and lyceum.  He attended a military school when he was 16 and was assigned in place with the Coimbra Infantry Regiments.  He continued to study at the University of Coimbra.

He soon revealed himself as a poet and a chronicler, he became an author in 1906 and published his first periodical contribution in the 1910s and were related for raising its republican ideals.

As a lieutenant, he took part in the Portuguese Expeditionary Force in Flanders from 1917 to 1918.  He was decorated with the Cross of the War, fourragère of the Tower of the Sword, Order of Christ, medal of Gold of Good Services, Military Cross, Legion of Honour, Order of Avis and the Order of Santiago where he was promoted to a captain during the campaign.

After the Great War, he taught at the Military College where he went on a campaign to marcate entirely the border between Angola and Belgian Congo (now the Democratic Republic of the Congo) which was worked under the direction of Norton de Matos who was High Commissioner of the Republic in Angola.

He went for some years to Angola where he greatly wrote on colonial themes and characters.

He was a staunch opponent and was head of the movements of the republican opposition of Estado Novo which took power in 1926, he took part in the 1931 Madeira Revolt where he was later dismissed from the army.  He was exiled to Cape Verde between 1933 and 1936, there, he wrote Ilhas Crioulas (Islands of Creole) in 1935 and two African related works.  The work Ilhas Crioulas formed the last ingredient for the creation of an anti-colonial review titled Claridade published in 1936, nearly a year after the publication of the work.  He returned in 1937 where he was put on reserve.

He kept a large literary activity, he published in many periodicals including A Águia and Seara Nova, he also contributed some articles in the reviews Serões (1910-1911), Azulejos (1907-1909), Amanhã in 1909 and Atlantida from 1915 to 1920.

In 1954, he published a collection of poems titled Portugal Atlântico — Poemas de África e de Mar (Atlantic Portugal: Poems from Africa and the Sea).  One of the poetic works included O Vitória do Homem [Victory of Man] (1910), A Primeira Nau (1912), À Catalunha [today's form: A Catalunha, translation: Catalonia] (1914), Primavera de Deus [Spring of Gods] (1915), Livro das Bem-Amadas (1921) and A Vida Continua [Continued Life] (1942).

He translated the work D. Teodósio II (Theodosius II) by D. Francisco Manuel de Melo into early Modern Portuguese in 1944 and elaborated the biography of Catherine of Braganza (Bragança) which was published as Dona Catarina de Bragança, Rainha de Inglaterra, FIlha de Portugal [Catherine of Bragança (Bragance), Queen of England, Daughter of Portugal] in 1956.

He died in Lisbon on 23 September 1967.

Published works
Para a Vida [For the Life], 1906
A Vitória do Homem, 1910
A Tentação do Mar, 1911
A Evocação da Vida, 1912
O Elogio da Primavera, 1912
A Primeira Nau, 1912
À Catalunha, 1914
Primavera de Deus, 1915 
A Hora de Nun'Álvares – versos , 1916
Nas trincheiras: fortificação e combate (co-authored by Mouzinho de Albuquerque), 1917
Nas Trincheiras da Flandres [Trenches in Flanders] (illustrations by Diogo de Macedo and Cristiano Cruz), 1918
Sidónio Pais": algumas notas sobre a intervenção de Portugal na Grande Guerra [Sidónio Pais, Some Notes on the Invervention of Portugal Into the Great War], 1919
Calvário da Flandres: 1918, 1920
Oração Lusíada [Lusiad Orations]
Os Portugueses e o Mundo [Portuguese and the World]
O Livro das Bem Amadas 
O Livro dos Cavaleiros [Book of Knights]
Naulila: 1914, 1922
A Educação Popular e a Poesia [People's Education and Poetry], 1922
África Nostra (Our Africa), 1923
Nova Largada – Romance de África (New Little Road - African Novel), 1929
Ilhas Crioulas (Islands of Creole), 1935
A Alma Africana (African Soul_, 1936
Paisagens de África (African Countrysides), 1936
Cartilha Colonial (Colonial Map), 1937
Momento na Eternidade (Moment of Eternity), 1940 
Portugal Crioulo (Creole Portugal), 1940
A Vida Continua (Continued Life), 1942
O Segredo de Potsdam (The Secret of Potsdam), 1945
Lisboa Mourisca: 1147-1947 (Moorish Lisbon, 1147-1947), 1947
Conquista da Terra: Hidráulica Agrícola Nacional (Conquest of Land: National Agricultural Hydraulics)
Nun'Álvares e o seu Monumento (Nuno Álvares and His Monument)
Portugal na História (Portugal in History), 1950
S. Francisco Xavier e os Portugueses (St. Francis Xavier and the Portuguese), 1954
Portugal Atlântico – Poemas da África e do Mar, 1955
Dona Catarina de Bragança: Rainha de Inglaterra, filha de Portugal, 1956 
Angola e o Futuro: alguns problemas fundamentais (Angola and the Future: Some Fundamental Problems)

Posthomous work
Obra Poética de Augusto Casimiro [Poetic Works by Augusto Casimiro] (preface by José Carlos Seara Pereira), Imprensa Nacional – Casa da Moeda, Lisbon, 2001

References

External links
Augusto Casimiro 
Digital version of D. Teodósio II (Theodosius II) 

1889 births
1967 deaths
20th-century Portuguese poets
Portuguese journalists
Male journalists
People from Lisbon
People from Amarante, Portugal
Portuguese male poets
20th-century male writers
20th-century journalists